Josef Kociok (26 April 1918 – 26 September 1943) was a German Luftwaffe pilot during World War II and a recipient of the Knight's Cross of the Iron Cross of Nazi Germany. He was killed in an air collision.

Aerial victory claims
Kociok was credited with 33 aerial victories on the Eastern Front, 21 of which were by night, claimed in 200 combat missions. His shooting down three Polikarpov Po-2s of the famed 46th Guards Night Bomber Aviation Regiment, nicknamed the "Night Witches", Nachthexen, on the night of 31 July 1943, resulted in the entire regiment being grounded for the first time.  For this feat, he was nicknamed Hexenjäger, or "Witch Hunter".

Awards
 Iron Cross (1939) 2nd and 1st Class
 Honour Goblet of the Luftwaffe (Ehrenpokal der Luftwaffe) on 1 June 1942 as Unteroffizier and pilot
 German Cross in Gold on 2 December 1942 as Feldwebel in the 4./Zerstörergeschwader 1
 Knight's Cross of the Iron Cross on 31 July 1943 as Oberfeldwebel and pilot in the 10.(NJ)/Zerstörergeschwader 1

References

Citations

Bibliography

 
 
 
 
 
 

1918 births
1943 deaths
People from Opole County
People from the Province of Silesia
Luftwaffe personnel killed in World War II
German World War II flying aces
Luftwaffe pilots
Recipients of the Gold German Cross
Recipients of the Knight's Cross of the Iron Cross